Wu Zhengyi (June 13, 1916 – June 20, 2013) was a Chinese botanist and an academician of the Chinese Academy of Sciences (CAS). Wu specialized in Botanical Geography and Medicinal Botany. He is also known by the alternative spellings of 'Wu Cheng-yih', 'Wu Zheng Yi' and 'Cheng Yih Wu'.

Wu was born in Jiujiang, Jiangxi, and grew up in Yangzhou, Jiangsu. He graduated from Tsinghua University in 1937. From 1940 to 1942, he pursued his postgraduate study at Peking University, under supervision of Zhang Jingyue, then chair of the department of Biology at PKU. In 1950, Wu became a research fellow and vice director of the Botanical Institute of CAS. He was elected an academician of CAS in 1955. Wu was appointed as the director of Kunming Botanical Institute of CAS in 1958.

International Cosmos Prize prizewinner 1999, On January 8, 2008, Wu received the prestigious State Preeminent Science and Technology Award for 2007, the highest scientific prize awarded in China.

References

External links
Kunming Institute of Botany's Editorial Center

1916 births
2013 deaths
Biologists from Jiangxi
20th-century Chinese botanists
Members of the Chinese Academy of Sciences
National Southwestern Associated University alumni
People from Jiujiang
Tsinghua University alumni